Justin Roth (born 29 October 2000) is a Swiss footballer who plays for FC Thun.

References

Swiss men's footballers
2000 births
Living people
Association football midfielders
FC Thun players
Swiss Super League players